Gorny is a rural locality (a village) in Kushnarenkovsky Selsoviet, Kushnarenkovsky District, Bashkortostan, Russia. The population was 6 as of 2010. There are 2 streets.

Geography 
Gorny is located 94 km northeast of Kushnarenkovo (the district's administrative centre) by road. Mansurovo is the nearest rural locality.

References 

Rural localities in Kushnarenkovsky District